The Nordic Women's Cup was a biennial competition in women's track and field between athletes from the Nordic countries organised by Nordic Athletics. Established in 1974, it lasted for five editions before holding the last competition in 1982. The competition was held in June or July in even-numbered years. Each of the five Nordic countries – Denmark, Finland, Iceland, Norway, and Sweden – hosted the competition during its lifetime.

The event programme included the women's pentathlon in 1976 – the medallists were Helena Pihl of Sweden (4081 points), Heidi Benserud representing Norway (3999 pts) and Helle Sichlau of Denmark (3897 pts).

Editions

References

Editions
Competition Venues. Nordic Athletics. Retrieved 2019-08-13.

Nordic Athletics competitions
Recurring sporting events established in 1974
Recurring sporting events disestablished in 1982
1974 establishments in Norway
Women's athletics competitions
Defunct athletics competitions